The Battle 4 Atlantis is an early-season college basketball tournament. It takes place at Atlantis Paradise Island on Paradise Island in The Bahamas, on the week of the US holiday of Thanksgiving. For sponsorship purposes, the tournament is officially named Bad Boy Mowers Battle 4 Atlantis. The games are played in the Imperial Arena, a grand ballroom which is turned into a basketball venue. The tournament is known for being the richest Division I men's early-season college basketball tournament. Schools are awarded $2 million in exchange for their participation in the men's event.

In 2020, the tournament was canceled due to the COVID-19 pandemic, which was scheduled to include a women's Battle 4 Atlantis tournament which also would have featured eight teams.

Tournament history

Tournament champions

Men's

Women's

Men's Mainland bracket champions

Brackets 
* – Denotes overtime period

2023 
 Arkansas
 Memphis
 Michigan
 North Carolina
 Northern Iowa
 Texas Tech
 Stanford
 Villanova

2022

Men's

Women's

2021

Men's

Women's

2020 
2020 Battle 4 Atlantis was canceled due to the COVID-19 pandemic

Men's 
Duke
Ohio State
West Virginia
Utah
Texas A&M
Wichita State
Creighton
Memphis

Women's 
 Central Michigan
 Marquette
 Minnesota
 Oklahoma
 Oregon
 South Carolina
 South Florida
 Syracuse

2019

2018

2017

Mainland Bracket

2016

Mainland Games 
Mainland Battle 4 Atlantis was unbracketed for 2016.

2015

Mainland Bracket

2014

Mainland Bracket

2013

2012

Mainland Bracket

2011

References

External links
Official site of the Battle 4 Atlantis

College basketball competitions
Recurring sporting events established in 2011
2011 establishments in the Bahamas
Basketball in the Bahamas